Gerd Nienstedt (10 July 1932 – 14 August 1993) was a German and Austrian opera singer, bass and bass-baritone. After an international career at major opera houses and the Bayreuth Festival, he was also a theatre director, stage director and academic voice teacher.

Career 
Karl Gustav Gerhard Nienstedt was born in Hanover. He studied voice at the Opernschule there with Otto Köhler. In 1965, he participated in the premiere of Bernd Alois Zimmermann's  in Cologne, singing the part of Haudy. He performed also in the Frankfurt production of the opera.

He was a member of the Vienna State Opera from 1964 to 1973, became an Austrian citizen and was awarded the title . He sang in 1968 at the  the part of King Wladislaw in Smetana's Dalibor, conducted by Rafael Kubelik, and in 1971 at La Scala the title role of Alban Berg's Wozzeck, conducted by Claudio Abbado and alongside Evelyn Lear as Marie.

In concert, Nienstedt sang the bass part in Bach's St Matthew Passion at the 1977 . In 1979 he performed in the premiere of the three-act version of Alban Berg's Lulu the parts of the animal tamer and Rodrigo, staged by Patrice Chéreau and conducted by Pierre Boulez, a performance recorded on DVD. Again with Boulez, he was in 1987 a soloist in Schoenberg's  in the Royal Albert Hall.

He died in Vienna.

Selected recordings 
 Alban Berg – Lulu, Rodrigo, Pierre Boulez (1979, DVD)
 Gustav Mahler – , London Symphony Orchestra, Pierre Boulez (1970)
 W.A. Mozart – Requiem: BBC Symphony Orchestra, Colin Davis (1967)
 Giuseppe Verdi – Rigoletto: Monterone, Orchestra of the Vienna State Opera, Carlo Franci (1970)
 Richard Wagner – 
 Kothner, Orchestra of the Bayreuth Festival, Silvio Varviso (1974)
 Kothner,  dirigiert von Georg Solti (1975)
 Wagner – Tannhäuser
 Reinmar, Orchestra of the Bayreuth Festival, Wolfgang Sawallisch (1962) 
 Reinmar, Orchestra of the Bayreuth Festival, Otmar Suitner (1964)
 Biterolf, Orchestra of the Bayreuth Festival, Carl Melles (1966)
 Wagner – 
 Gürzenich Orchestra, Wolfgang Sawallisch (1962)
 Donner, Orchestra of the Bayreuth Festival, Karl Böhm, (1966)
 Wagner – : Hunding, Orchestra of the Bayreuth Festival, Karl Böhm, (1967)
 Wagner – : Steuermann, Orchestra of the Bayreuth Festival, Karl Böhm (1966)
 Wagner – Parsifal: Orchestra of the Bayreuth Festival, Hans Knappertsbusch
 Wagner – Lohengrin: Heerrufer, Orchestra of the Bayreuth Festival, Rafael Kubelik (1971)
 Bernd Alois Zimmermann – : Haudy, Gürzenich Orchestra, Michael Gielen (1965, WERGO)

References

External links 
 
 Nienstedt, Gerd Bibliotheken Archive Museen
 Gerd Nienstedt operadepot.com
 

German operatic basses
1932 births
1993 deaths
Musicians from Hanover
German bass-baritones
Academic staff of the Hochschule für Musik Detmold

20th-century German male opera singers
Österreichischer Kammersänger
Naturalised citizens of Austria